George Chan may refer to:

 George B. Chan (1921–1998), American art director
 George Chan Hong Nam (born 1936), former Deputy Chief Minister of Sarawak